T'ikapallana (Quechua t'ika flower, pallay to collect, pallana an instrument to collect fruit / collectable, "a place where you collect flowers", Hispanicized spelling Ticapallana) is a mountain  in the Andes of Peru. T'ikapallana is situated in the Cusco Region, Chumbivilcas Province, Chamaca District.

References 

Mountains of Peru
Mountains of Cusco Region